The original Lytham railway station was the Lytham terminus of a branch of the Preston and Wyre Joint Railway from Kirkham in Lancashire, England. It opened, along with the branch, on 16 February 1846; the road it was located in became known as Station Road. It was built in a Renaissance style from Longridge stone. A branch was also built to the dock at Lytham Pool.

In 1863, the Blackpool and Lytham Railway opened a separate line to its own station in Ballam Road, Lytham.

By 1874, both lines were owned jointly by the Lancashire and Yorkshire Railway and the London and North Western Railway. Ballam Road station was rebuilt as a through station and a connecting line was built to join the other line east of Lytham. The original station in Station Road was then closed to passengers, but continued to be used as a goods station until 1963.

A fire station now occupies the site.

References 

 Welch, M.S. (2004) Lancashire Steam Finale, Runpast Publishing, Cheltenham, p. 29
 Hughes, R.V. (1931), "Early Coast travel", LMS Magazine, February 1931, accessed online 18 October 2007

Disused railway stations in the Borough of Fylde
Former Preston and Wyre Joint Railway stations
Railway stations in Great Britain opened in 1846
Railway stations in Great Britain closed in 1874
Lytham St Annes
1846 establishments in England